This is a list of fossiliferous stratigraphic units in Botswana.



See also 
 Lists of fossiliferous stratigraphic units in Africa
 List of fossiliferous stratigraphic units in Namibia
 List of fossiliferous stratigraphic units in South Africa
 List of fossiliferous stratigraphic units in Zambia
 List of fossiliferous stratigraphic units in Zimbabwe
 Geology of Botswana

References

Further reading 
 D. Green. 1966. The Karroo [sic] System in Bechuanaland. Government of Bechuanaland, Geological Survey Department Bulletin 2

 
Botswana
 
Botswana geography-related lists
Fossil